E. xera  may refer to:
 Eriopyga xera, Dyar, 1914, a moth species in the genus Eriopyga
 Exerodonta xera, a frog species endemic to Mexico

See also
 Xera (disambiguation)